Eucalyptus formanii, commonly known as Die Hardy mallee, Forman's mallee, or feather gum, is a species of tree or mallee that is endemic to Western Australia. It has rough bark over most, or all of its trunk, smooth bark above, linear adult leaves, flower buds in groups of seven or nine, creamy white flowers and cup-shaped to hemispherical fruit.

Description
The bark on part or all of the trunk is rough, grey and fibrous or flaky, smooth creamy brown to pinkish grey and shed in scruffy ribbons above. Flowering occurs between December and April and the flowers are creamy white.

Taxonomy and naming
Eucalyptus formanii was first formally described in 1943 by Charles Gardner in the Journal of the Royal Society of Western Australia. The specific epithet (formanii) honours "Francis Gloster Forman, Government Geologist of Western Australia, who brought me [C.A.Gardner] the first specimens of this plant."

The Die Hardy Ranges, or Mount Geraldine, is a range of hills north of Mount Jackson where there are abandoned gold mines. In 2010, the range was declared a nature reserve.

Distribution
Die Hardy mallee is found on ironstone slopes north of Bullfinch in the Coolgardie, Murchison and Yalgoo biogeographic regions of Western Australia, where it grows in sandy soils. It forms part of  low woodland communities that cover a substantial part of the base of the Mount Manning Nature Reserve, occurring on flat sandy plains in broad valleys with sandy loam soil types. The composition of the flora is complex with several intermediate strata of tall and low shrubs consisting of Grevillea acuaria, Bossiaea walkeri and various species of Eremophila.

Conservation status
This eucalypt is classified as "Priority Four" by the Government of Western Australia Department of Parks and Wildlife, meaning that is rare or near threatened.

Use in horticulture
The fine, crowded leaves and coppicing features of this eucalypt may have ornamental value.

See also
List of Eucalyptus species

References

formanii
Endemic flora of Western Australia
Mallees (habit)
Myrtales of Australia
Eucalypts of Western Australia
Plants described in 1942
Taxa named by Charles Gardner